Money Means Nothing (also released as Butler's Millions) is a 1932 British comedy film directed by Herbert Wilcox and starring John Loder, Irene Richards and Miles Malleson. It was shot at Elstree Studios as a quota quickie for release by Paramount British.

Synopsis
The screenplay concerns a butler who comes into some money through an inheritance, and turns the tables on his young master.

Cast
John Loder as Earl Egbert
Irene Richards as Livia Faringay
Gibb McLaughlin as Augustus Bethersyde
A. Bromley Davenport as Earl of Massingham
Kay Hammond as Angel
Miles Malleson as Doorman
Dorothy Robinson as Daysie de Lille
Clive Currie as Sir Percival Puttock
Maidel Turner as Mrs. Kerry Green

References

Bibliography
 Chibnall, Steve. Quota Quickies: The Birth of the British 'B' Film. British Film Institute, 2007.
 Low, Rachael. Filmmaking in 1930s Britain. George Allen & Unwin, 1985.
 Wood, Linda. British Films, 1927-1939. British Film Institute, 1986.

External links

1932 films
1932 comedy films
British comedy films
1930s English-language films
Films directed by Herbert Wilcox
British black-and-white films
Films shot at Imperial Studios, Elstree
1930s British films